Clitarchus is a genus of stick insects in the Phasmatidae family and Phasmatinae sub-family. This genus is the most common stick insect in New Zealand. It is found widely throughout the North Island and part of the South Island on kanuka and manuka, as well as various common garden plants.

Species
There are currently three recognized species in this genus:

Clitarchus hookeri White, 1846
Clitarchus tepaki Buckley, Myers and Bradler, 2014
Clitarchus rakauwhakanekeneke Buckley, Myers and Bradler, 2014

References

External links

 
Phasmatodea genera
Phasmatidae of New Zealand
Taxa named by Carl Stål
Phasmatidae